The Ibis GS-750 Grand Magic is a Colombian homebuilt aircraft, designed and produced by Ibis Aircraft of Cali, introduced in 2006. The aircraft is supplied as a complete ready-to-fly-aircraft or as a kit for amateur construction.

Design and development
The GS-750 Grand Magic is a development of the two-seat Ibis GS-700 Magic. It features a strut-braced high-wing, a four-seat enclosed cabin with doors, fixed tricycle landing gear with wheel pants and a single engine in tractor configuration.

The aircraft is made from sheet aluminium "all-metal" construction, with the wing tips and cowling made from composite material. The wing is supported by V-struts and jury struts. The main landing gear is sprung 7075-T6 aluminium, while the nose gear has lever suspension using rubber pucks and helical springs. The main wheels include hydraulic disc brakes.

Operational history
In February 2007 the prototype was delivered to a customer in Ecuador.

Specifications (GS-750 Grand Magic)

References

External links

GS-750 Grand Magic
2000s Colombian civil utility aircraft
Single-engined tractor aircraft
High-wing aircraft
Homebuilt aircraft